The Marie-Victorin Statue, created by Sylvia Daoust, is a monument in the Botanical Garden of Montreal, Quebec, Canada. 
The monument to Brother Marie-Victorin (Marie-Victorin Kirouac) was unveiled by Maurice Duplessis and Paul-Émile Léger on September 18, 1954.

Gallery

References

External links
  
  Inauguration de la statue du frère Marie-Victorin 

 
1954 in Canada
1954 sculptures
Bronze sculptures in Canada
Monuments and memorials in Montreal
Monuments and memorials to scientists
Outdoor sculptures in Montreal
Sculptures of men in Canada
Statues in Canada
Cultural depictions of Canadian men
Cultural depictions of scientists